The 2021–22 Coupe de France preliminary rounds, Nouvelle-Aquitaine was the qualifying competition to decide which teams from the leagues of the Nouvelle-Aquitaine region of France took part in the main competition from the seventh round.

A total of thirteen teams qualified from the Nouvelle-Aquitaine preliminary rounds. In 2020–21, US Lège Cap Ferret and Stade Poitevin FC progressed furthest in the main competition, reaching the round of 64 before losing to Aubagne FC and Canet Roussillon FC respectively.

Draws and fixtures
On 13 July 2021, the league announced that a total of 689 teams had entered from the region. The first round would consist of 296 ties, featuring all teams from Régional 3 and below, plus 25 teams from Régional 2. The 45 exempted teams from Régional 2 and all 36 teams from Régional 1 entered at the second round stage. The 12 Championnat National 3 teams entered at the third round stage and the 4 Championnat National 2 teams entered at the fourth round stage.

First round
These matches were played on 27, 28 and 29 August 2021.

Second round
These matches were played on 3, 4 and 5 September 2021.

Third round
These matches were played on 17, 18 and 19 September 2021.

Fourth round
These matches were played on 2 and 3 October 2021.

Fifth round
These matches were played on 16 and 17 October 2021.

Sixth round
These matches were played on 30 and 31 October 2021.

References

preliminary rounds